Hope Baldwin McCormick (July 9, 1919 – July 13, 1993) was an American socialite, philanthropist, and politician.

Born in Bedford Hills, New York, McCormick went to Ethel Walker School in Simsbury, Connecticut. In 1940, she married Brooks McCormick who was the executive vice president of the International Harvester Company. McCormick was also involved with civic and community  affairs in Chicago, Illinois. She was involved with the Republican Party. McCormick served in the Illinois House of Representatives from 1965 to 1967. She was elected as an at-large representatives because of problems with reapportionment. McCormick died at her home in Chicago after suffering from a brief illness. In 1971, she was the Illinois State Committeewoman to the Republican National Convention.

Notes

External links

1919 births
1993 deaths
People from Bedford Hills, New York
Politicians from Chicago
Women state legislators in Illinois
Republican Party members of the Illinois House of Representatives
McCormick family
20th-century American politicians
20th-century American women politicians